Batrad is a village in Zakarpattia Oblast (province) of western Ukraine.

Geography
The village is located around 22 km northwest of Berehovo. Administratively, the village belongs to the Berehove Raion, Zakarpattia Oblast.

Area
The total area is of 2.520 thousand square meters.

Population
Nowadays the population includes 1846 inhabitants, with a density of 
732,540 people / km2

Notes

Villages in Berehove Raion